Le Fort, as a surname, can refer to:

Surname
 Léon Clément Le Fort (1829–1893), French surgeon
 René Le Fort (1869–1951), French surgeon
 François Le Fort (16th century), French merchant
 François Jacques Le Fort (Frants Yakovlevich Lefort; 1656–1699), Russian general admiral (1695), and close associate of Tsar Peter the Great.
 Gertrud von Le Fort (1876–1971), German writer

Other uses
 Le Fort fracture (disambiguation)
 Le Fort III (disambiguation)
 Lefort, a surname
 Lefortovo (disambiguation)